The 2013 season was the Miami Dolphins' 44th in the National Football league (NFL) and their 48th overall. The season concluded with the Dolphins finishing third in the AFC East division with an 8–8 record, and no postseason play for the fifth consecutive season. The Dolphins allowed a league-high 58 sacks.

The Dolphins entered the season under second-year head coach Joe Philbin.

Personnel changes

Logo change
During the 2012 season, speculation about the Dolphins updating their current logo, which was introduced during the 1997 season, began during a conference call with season-ticket holders; as owner Stephen Ross and CEO Mike Dee eagerly agreed with a fan on the potential changing of the logo. On December 26, 2012, via Dolphins CEO Mike Dee's Twitter account, Dee unofficially announced that a logo change would take place, but the team was still considering different designs; and an official announcement would be provided sometime before the 2013 NFL Draft.

On March 27, 2013, following an accidental leaking of the new Dolphins logo on NFL.com, Dee confirmed in a press conference that the leaked image, as seen on NFL.com, was in fact the new official logo. This announcement came almost a month premature to the scheduled release date of the logo on April 25.

Roster changes

Signings

Re-Signings

Departures

The Miami Dolphins entered the 2013 off-season with an estimated $45 million in salary cap space, third most among other teams, to retain the contracts of impending unrestricted free agents: running back Reggie Bush, safety Chris Clemons, tight end Anthony Fasano, wide receiver Brian Hartline, offensive tackle Jake Long, quarterback Matt Moore, cornerback Sean Smith and defensive tackle Randy Starks. As well as any future free agent signings, and 2013 NFL Draft picks.

On March 4, 2013, the Dolphins placed their franchise tag on defensive tackle Randy Starks, and Starks signed the franchise tender on March 20. The move kept Starks from becoming an unrestricted free agent and guaranteed him $8.45 million from the $3.72 million earned during the 2012 season.

On March 8, 2013, coming off his best career season, wide receiver Brian Hartline signed a new five-year contract for an estimated $31 million to remain with the Dolphins. Hartline's agent Drew Rosenhaus believed Hartline could have received more money in the open market, but decided to take a discount to remain a Dolphin. Shortly after, it was reported that quarterback Matt Moore signed a new two-year contract for an estimated $8 million, and should continue to play a backup role behind second year quarterback Ryan Tannehill.

When the NFL free agency period began at 4 p.m. EST on March 12, 2013, former Pittsburgh Steelers wide receiver Mike Wallace, who was viewed as the top free agent prospect of the 2013 offseason by many analysts, signed a five-year contract for an estimated $60 million. The Dolphins signed former Baltimore Ravens linebacker Dannell Ellerbe to a five-year deal worth an estimated $35 million, and former Oakland Raiders linebacker Philip Wheeler to a five-year deal worth an estimated $26 million. Subsequently, Miami released veteran linebackers Karlos Dansby and Kevin Burnett. While safety Chris Clemons re-signed a one-year contract to remain a Dolphin, and unrestricted free agent Anthony Fasano, who had spent the last five seasons in Miami, signed a four-year deal with the Kansas City Chiefs.

On March 13, 2013, it was reported that Reggie Bush had signed a four-year $16 million contract to play for the Detroit Lions.

On March 15, 2013, cornerback Sean Smith decided to part ways from the Dolphins and signed a new three-year contract with the Kansas City Chiefs. Former New York Jets tight end Dustin Keller signed a new one-year contract, worth an estimated $4.25 million, and former St. Louis Rams wide receiver Brandon Gibson signed a new three-year contract with the Dolphins.

Former Dolphins 2008 first round draft pick, offensive tackle Jake Long, after courting offers from various teams, signed a new four-year contract, worth an estimated $34 million, with the St. Louis Rams on March 18, 2013.

On March 30, 2013, cornerback Brent Grimes signed a one-year $5.5 million year with the Dolphins.

On October 22, 2013, the Dolphins acquired offensive tackle Bryant McKinnie from the Baltimore Ravens for a conditional late round pick.

2013 draft class

The 2013 National Football League Draft was held from April 25–27 in the Radio City Music Hall in New York City.

Notes
 The Dolphins traded their first- (No. 12 overall) and original second- (No. 42 overall) round selections to the Oakland Raiders in exchange for the Raiders' first-round selection (No. 3 overall).
 The Dolphins acquired this second-round selection in a trade that sent cornerback Vontae Davis to the Indianapolis Colts.
 The Dolphins previously acquired an additional third-round selection — No. 82 overall — as part of a March 2012 trade that sent wide receiver Brandon Marshall to the Chicago Bears. The Dolphins later traded the No. 82 selection to the New Orleans Saints in exchange for two fourth-round selections from the Saints — Nos. 106 and 109 overall. The No. 109 selection, along with the Dolphins' original fifth-round selection (No. 146 overall) and one of their seventh-round selections (No. 224 overall — previously acquired in a July 2012 trade that sent guard Ryan Cook to the Dallas Cowboys), were traded to the Green Bay Packers in exchange for one of the Packers' third-round selections (No. 93 overall).
 The Dolphins acquired these fourth- and fifth-round selections in a trade that sent wide receiver Davone Bess the team's original fourth- and seventh-round selections (Nos. 111 and 217 overall, respectively) to the Cleveland Browns.
 Compensatory selection.
The Dolphins did not have a selection in the sixth round. The team traded their sixth-round selection (No. 180 overall) along with fourth- and sixth-round selections from the 2012 NFL Draft to the San Francisco 49ers in exchange for the 49ers' 2012 fourth-round selection.

Staff

Final roster

Schedule

Preseason

Regular season

Note: Intra-division opponents are in bold text.

Game summaries

Week 1: at Cleveland Browns

The Dolphins started their 2013 season on the road against the Browns. They would score first in the 1st quarter as Caleb Sturgis kicked a 45-yard field goal for a 3-0 lead. They led 6-0 in the 2nd quarter after Sturgis kicked a 49-yard field goal. The Browns got on the board and took the lead before halftime as Brandon Weeden found Jordan Cameron on a 7-yard pass for a 7-6 score. After the break, the Dolphins went back to work and took the lead as Ryan Tannehill found Brian Hartline for a 34-yard pass and retook the lead 13-7. The Browns then came within 3 as Billy Cundiff kicked a 39-yard field goal shortening the lead to 13-10. In the 4th quarter it was all Dolphins and Daniel Thomas ran for a 1-yard TD making the score 20-10 while Sturgis kicked a 36-yard field goal for the final score of the game 23-10. It was the Dolphins' first road win over the Browns since 1993.

With the win, the Dolphins began their season 1-0.

Week 2: at Indianapolis Colts

The Dolphins traveled to take on the Colts. In the 1st quarter they got off to a fast start as Mike Wallace and Ryan Tannehill connected on an 18-yard TD pass for a 7-0 lead. The Colts got on the board as Adam Vinatieri nailed a 30-yard field goal for a 7-3 score. The Dolphins then increased their lead as Lamar Miller ran for a 10-yard TD making the score 14-3. The Colts would score in the 2nd quarter as Andrew Luck found Coby Fleener on a 3-yard TD pass shortening the lead to 4, 14-10. They eventually grabbed the lead as Ahmad Bradshaw ran for a 1-yard TD, 17-14. Caleb Sturgis of the Dolphins tied it up before halftime with a 54-yard field goal, 17-17. In the 3rd quarter, the Colts retook the lead as Vinatieri nailed a 38-yard field goal for a 20-17 game. The Dolphins then retook the lead as Charles Clay ran for a 1-yard TD for a 24-20 game. The Dolphins then held the Colts scoreless in the 4th quarter and vice versa which eventually gave the team the win as they improved to 2-0 on the season. This was also the Dolphins' first road win over the Colts since 2002.

Week 3: vs. Atlanta Falcons

The Dolphins went home for their season opener against the Falcons. The Falcons got off to a fast start as Matt Ryan found Jason Snelling on a 7-yard TD pass for a 7-0 lead the only score of the 1st quarter. They would make it 10-0 when Matt Bryant kicked a 52-yard field goal. The Dolphins got on the board when Daniel Thomas ran for a 5-yard TD coming within 3, 10-7. The Falcons then pushed ahead by 6 when Matt Bryant kicked a 30-yard field goal for a 13-7 lead. The Dolphins then wrapped up the scoring when Caleb Sturgis nailed a 46-yard field goal coming within 3 at halftime 13-10. The Falcons increased their lead in the 3rd quarter when Levine Toilolo caught a 2-yard pass from Ryan for a 20-10 lead not long before the Dolphins managed to tie the game at 20 when Sturgis kicked a 50-yard field goal followed up by Tannehill finding Brian Hartline on an 18-yard TD pass. The Falcons moved ahead in the 4th quarter as Bryant kicked a 33-yard field goal for a 23-20 lead but the Dolphins later on would score the game-winning TD when Tannehill found Dion Sims on a 1-yard pass for a final score of 27-23.

With the win, the Dolphins improved to 3-0.

Week 4: at New Orleans Saints
The Dolphins would suffer their first loss of the season as they lost to the New Orleans Saints 38-17 on Monday Night Football and failed to earn their first 4-0 start since 1995.

Week 5: vs. Baltimore Ravens

Miami would miss a field goal with less than a minute remaining. The miss doomed the Dolphins, as they lost to Baltimore 26-23 in a shootout game.

With the loss, Miami fell to 3-2.

Week 7: vs. Buffalo Bills

With their third straight loss, Miami fell to 3-3 after starting 3-0.

Week 8: at New England Patriots

With the loss, the Dolphins fell to 3-4.

Week 9: vs. Cincinnati Bengals

The Dolphins would force four turnovers in this game as they beat Cincinnati 22-20 in overtime on Thursday Night Football. The game ended with a safety in overtime on a sack on Andy Dalton in the end zone by Cameron Wake. It was the first time since Adewale Ogunleye tackled Fred Miller in Miller's own end zone on November 14, 2004, a game ended on a safety in overtime.

With the win, the Dolphins evened their record at 4-4.

Week 10: at Tampa Bay Buccaneers

Tampa Bay came into this game having not won a game, at 0-8. The Dolphins would trail 15-0 for most of the first 2 quarters, but they would score 19 unanswered points from the end of the second quarter through most of the third to take a 19-15 lead. However, the Buccaneers would take the lead for good when they scored a touchdown early in the fourth quarter to go up 22-19, which would be the final score, thus giving the Buccaneers their first win of the season. The Dolphins were also seeking their first win in Tampa since 1988.

With the bitter loss, the Dolphins fell to 4-5.

Week 11: vs. San Diego Chargers

With the win, the Dolphins improved to 5-5.

Week 12: vs. Carolina Panthers

Miami would build a 16-3 lead at one point. But the Panthers would rally behind Cam Newton to score a touchdown with less than a minute left. For the first time in franchise history, the Dolphins were defeated by the Panthers, as they had come into this game 4-0 all time against them.

With the loss, the Dolphins fell to 5-6.

Week 13: at New York Jets

With the commanding win, the Dolphins evened their record at 6-6.

Week 14: at Pittsburgh Steelers

In a game filled with snow similar to the Snowplow Game, the Dolphins would upset the Steelers 34-28 to keep their playoff hopes alive. The game is notable for the final play, in which the Steelers lateralled the ball 7 times, with the final lateral pass being caught by Antonio Brown in stride. Brown then sprinted down the sidelines, avoided several tackles, and sprinted into the endzone for an apparent game-winning touchdown. However, most noticeable on replay, Brown barely stepped out of bounds, with the left half of his foot barely touching the sideline. With the win, the Dolphins improved to 7-6. It was also the Dolphins' first win in Pittsburgh since 1990.

Week 15: vs. New England Patriots

With the win, the Dolphins improved to 8–6 and climbed to the second Wild Card seat; however, with the Ravens' victory over the Lions the following night, the team went back to the seventh spot in the playoff hunt.

Week 16: at Buffalo Bills

With the shutout loss, the Dolphins fell to 8-7 and put their playoff hopes on the line. This was the first time the Dolphins had been shoutout since week 17 of last year against the Patriots.

Week 17: vs. New York Jets

With the loss, coupled with a wins by the Steelers and Chargers, the Dolphins ended their season 8-8.

Standings

Division

Conference

References

External links
 
 Miami Dolphins & NFL at the Miami Herald
 2013 Miami Dolphins at ESPN

Miami
Miami Dolphins seasons
Miami Dolphins